Gonocercidae is a family of trematodes belonging to the order Plagiorchiida.

Genera:
 Gonocerca Manter, 1925
 Hemipera Nicoll, 1913

References

Plagiorchiida